Roelien J. Kamminga (born 13 April 1978) is a Dutch politician and civil servant who has represented the conservative-liberal People's Party for Freedom and Democracy (VVD) in the House of Representatives since 2021. She previously worked at the Ministry of the Interior and Kingdom Relations for most of her career.

Early life and career 
Kamminga was born in 1978 in Groningen. She grew up in the village of Zuidbroek and attended the Veendam secondary school Winkler Prins at vwo level. She subsequently studied English language and literature at the University of Groningen, obtaining her  in 2000. She also studied international relations at the same university until her graduation in 2004.

Kamminga's first job was in Vienna for the Ministry of Foreign Affairs as an adviser to the permanent mission of the Netherlands to the United Nations. In 2005, Kamminga started working at the Ministry of the Interior and Kingdom Relations. She first served as an international security analyst and as a counter-proliferation policy officer. Between 2009 and 2012, she headed the ministry's security investigations business unit. Kamminga then worked as an intelligence and security issues advisor to Minister Ronald Plasterk and – starting in 2014 – as a public order, intelligence, and security adviser. While in the latter position, she also served for a few months in 2017 as acting director general of reconstruction, assisting Sint Maarten in the wake of Hurricane Irma.

Between September 2019 and her election to the House in 2021, Kamminga was director of the interior and kingdom relations ministry's program concerning induced earthquakes due to gas extraction in the province of Groningen.

Politics 
Kamminga was the VVD's seventh candidate in the 2019 European Parliament election and was not elected. She ran for member of parliament in the 2021 general election, being placed 14th on the VVD's party list. Kamminga received 6,334 preference votes and was sworn into the House of Representatives on 31 March. She became the VVD's spokesperson for European affairs, and kingdom relations was later added to that. She is part of the following committees and groups:
 Contact group Belgium
 Contact group France
 Contact group Germany
 Contact group United Kingdom
 Committee for Digital Affairs (chair)
 Dutch parliamentary delegation to the Council of Europe
 Committee for European Affairs
 Committee for Foreign Affairs
 Committee for Foreign Trade and Development Cooperation
 Committee for the Interior
 Committee for Kingdom Relations
 Procedure Committee
 Benelux Interparliamentary Consultative Council

In the March 2022 municipal elections, Kamminga was the VVD's  in Midden-Groningen. She succeeded Ockje Tellegen as deputy chair of the House of Representatives and as secretary of the VVD's parliamentary group in August 2022. European affairs was simultaneously dropped from her specialties.

Personal life 
Kamminga moved from the city of Groningen to Zuidbroek, located in the same province, while a member of parliament.

References

External links 
 Campaign website 

1978 births
21st-century Dutch civil servants
21st-century Dutch politicians
21st-century Dutch women politicians
People's Party for Freedom and Democracy politicians
Living people
Members of the House of Representatives (Netherlands)
Politicians from Groningen (city)
University of Groningen alumni